Zheng Xiu (4th-century BC), was the queen consort of King Huai of Chu, who reigned in 328-299 BC.

She was involved in state affairs and has traditionally been blamed for the captivity of her spouse and ensuing political instability.

References 

4th-century BC births
4th-century BC deaths
Chinese queens
4th-century BC Chinese women
4th-century BC Chinese people